Harvey of Léon was the name of several members of the House of Léon who were Viscounts of Léon or Lords of Léon.

Viscounts of Léon 
 Harvey I
 Harvey II
 Harvey III
 Harvey IV

Lords of Léon 
 Harvey I
 Harvey II
 Harvey III
 Harvey IV
 Harvey V
 Harvey VI
 Harvey VII
 Harvey VIII

Viscounts of Léon
Lordship of Léon
House of Léon